Drag Lake is a glacial lake in the township of Dysart et al in  Haliburton County, Southern Ontario, Canada.

The lake is in Great Lakes Basin, and its primary inflow, at the east, and outflow, at the west and controlled by a dam, is the Drag River.

Residents of Drag Lake are represented by the Drag and Spruce Lake Property Owners Association.

See also
List of lakes in Ontario

References

Other map sources:

Lakes of Haliburton County
fish species: Lake trout, largemouth and smallmouth bass, rock bass, sunfish, perch, crappie.